Aam Aadmi Party (AAP) is a political party in India, founded in November 2012 by Arvind Kejriwal and his companions. It is currently the ruling party of two governments: Delhi, the capital territory of India, and the state of Punjab. Presently none of the AAP MPs are there in Loksabha. Last seat was lost by Bhagwant Mann from Sangrur constituency.

References

External links

Aam